The 1997 British Open was a professional ranking snooker tournament, that was held from March to April 1997 at the Plymouth Pavilions, Plymouth, England.
 
Mark Williams won the tournament by defeating Stephen Hendry nine frames to two in the final. The defending champion, Nigel Bond, was defeated in the last 16 by Tony Drago.


Main draw

References

British Open (snooker)
British Open
Open (snooker)
British Open
British Open